Swordfish is the debut studio album by New Zealand pop musician Merk released on 18 November 2016 by Dew Process and Flying Out. It was written and produced by Merk under his real name, Mark Perkins.

Background and promotion
Merk's debut single "No Better Reason" was released to his SoundCloud on 19 May 2016. His second single "Manchuria" was released on 3 June. The third single "I'm Easy" was released on 26 August; a music video was released beforehand on 30 March. His fourth single off the album "Ash & Sand" was released just on his SoundCloud similar to his first.

Swordfish was then released on 18 November in CD, digital download, and limited run cassette tape formats.

"Lucky Dilemma" a single released on 2 May 2018, was later added to subsequent reissues of Swordfish.

Writing and composition
The albums genres are categorised as alternative pop, indie pop, and psychedelic pop. The track "Treehouse Club" is about human's overall sense of dissatisfaction and how they're all waiting for something better. Mark Perkins said, "our natural tendency is to either be consumed by the future or the past." Perkins describes "Lucky Dilemma" as being about "the paradox of choice - sometimes we have so many options it's crippling instead of empowering."

Merk stated it took him about six months to record the album and that he made five alternate versions to every song.

Critical reception
Felix Mpunga from NZ Musician praised the album, particularly "how  managed to keep his project short and sweet at 25 minutes, whilst showing off his skills as musician and producer." Swordfish won the Independent Music NZ's inaugural Auckland Live Best Independent Debut award in 2017.

Track listing
Track listing adapted from iTunes.

Personnel
Adapted from BandCamp.
 Mark Perkins (Merk) – vocals, instruments, writing, producer, mixing, album artwork
 Alice Crowe – cello (track 4)
 Ben Jeffares – co-writer (tracks 2 & 7)
 Alexander Wildwood – co-writer (track 9)
 Djeisan Suskov – mastering
 Shannon Fowler – mastering (track 11)
 Steph Norman – album artwork

Charts

References

2016 debut albums
Merk (musician) albums
Dew Process albums